Omar Mouhli (born 19 March 1986) is a Tunisian basketball player for Étoile Sportive du Sahel and the Tunisian national team.

He participated at the AfroBasket 2017.

References

External links

1986 births
Living people
Tunisian men's basketball players
Guards (basketball)
Étoile Sportive du Sahel basketball players
Mediterranean Games bronze medalists for Tunisia
Mediterranean Games medalists in basketball
Competitors at the 2013 Mediterranean Games
US Monastir basketball players
21st-century Tunisian people
20th-century Tunisian people